The Île-de-France regional election, 2010 took place on March 14 and 21, 2010. Jean-Paul Huchon was elected a new time as President of the Île-de-France.

Candidates 
The following were candidates:
 PS : Jean-Paul Huchon
 Europe Écologie : Cécile Duflot
 FG : Pierre Laurent
 MoDem : Alain Dolium
 AEI : Jean-Marc Governatori
 Presidential Majority - UMP : Valérie Pécresse
 DLR : Nicolas Dupont-Aignan
 FN : Marie-Christine Arnautu
 NPA : Olivier Besancenot
 LO : Jean Pierre Mercier

Socialist Party Primary 

Incumbent President Jean-Paul Huchon won the primary by a landside against outsider Kamal Mazouzi (88% to 12%).

Union for a Popular Movement Primary

Polls

Runoff polls

Results 

* list of the incumbent president

The previous majority (left wing), led by Jean-Paul Huchon, won this election, and Jean-Paul Huchon was thus elected President of the region one more time.

References 

Politics of Île-de-France
 
2010 elections in France